T’oung Pao, founded in 1890, is a Dutch journal and the oldest international journal of sinology. It is published by the publisher E. J. Brill. 

T'oung Pao'''s original full title was T’oung Pao ou Archives pour servir à l’étude de l’histoire, des langues, la geographie et l’ethnographie de l’Asie Orientale (Chine, Japon, Corée, Indo-Chine, Asie Centrale et Malaisie) ("Tongbao or Archives for Use in the Study of the History, Languages, Geography, and Ethnography of East Asia [China, Japan, Korea, Indochina, Central Asia, and Malaysia]"). 

The first co editors-in-chief were Henri Cordier and Gustav Schlegel. The journal's title T’oung Pao appears to be romanized based on the system of Jean Baptiste Bourguignon d'Anville, rather than Wade-Giles.

Traditionally, T'oung Pao'' was co-edited by two sinologists, one from France and one from the Netherlands.  However, the tradition has been discontinued. The current editors are Vincent Goossaert (French – Centre national de la recherche scientifique), Martin Kern (German – Princeton University), and James Robson (American – Harvard University).

List of past editors
Dutch
Gustav Schlegel (1890–1903)
J.J.L. Duyvendak (1934–1954)
A.F.P. Hulsewé (1954–1975)

French
Henri Cordier (1890–1925)
Édouard Chavannes (1904–1916)
Paul Pelliot (1920–1942)
Paul Demiéville (1945–1975)

References

External links

 The journal's website at Brill's site
  T'oung Pao, Vol. I, first issue, 1890.
 Some early volumes of the journal on archive.org (through volume 21, dated 1922);   

Sinology
Chinese studies journals
Publications established in 1890
Brill Publishers academic journals
5 times per year journals